Song Chen (born 3 June 1967) is a Chinese speed skater. He competed in two events at the 1992 Winter Olympics.

References

External links
 

1967 births
Living people
Chinese male speed skaters
Olympic speed skaters of China
Speed skaters at the 1992 Winter Olympics
Place of birth missing (living people)
Speed skaters at the 1990 Asian Winter Games
Medalists at the 1990 Asian Winter Games
Asian Games medalists in speed skating
Asian Games gold medalists for China
Asian Games silver medalists for China
20th-century Chinese people